The 2008 UTEP Miners football team represented the University of Texas at El Paso in the 2008 NCAA Division I FBS football season. The team's head coach was Mike Price. The Miners played their home games at the Sun Bowl Stadium in El Paso, Texas. UTEP averaged 37,296 fans per game, ranking 66th nationally.

Schedule

*** Denotes the largest crowd ever for the Sun Bowl Stadium.

Game summaries

Buffalo

In their first trip to the state of New York, UTEP rolled up 266 yards but had three turnovers while the Bulls' Drew Willy threw four touchdown passes to help Buffalo to a 42–17 victory over the Minders.  Willy complete 10-of-16 passing attempts for 221 passing yards and no interceptions. His first completion of the game broke Cliff Scott's school record for career completions.  The UTEP defense surrendered 484 total yards.

Texas

This game marks the first time for the Miners to play the Texas Longhorns. Texas holds a 2–0 record against the Miners, with the most recent game occurring in 1933 when the school was known as The Texas State School of Mines and Metallurgy.  Besides both being in The University of Texas System the two schools also share the same alma mater, "The Eyes of Texas". While Miners' fans make a symbol called the "Pickaxe", with pinkie and thumb extended from a closed fist, the Longhorns have the Hook 'em Horns symbol.

After the Miners opened their season with a loss to the Buffalo Bulls 42–17, Miners coach Mike Price said of the upcoming game against the Longhorns, "Man, I hope they're not as good as Buffalo."

The kickoff for the game was set for 8:00 pm local time (Mountain Time) which is an unusually late start and which translates to 9:00 pm in Austin.  Sports analysts have speculated that the Miners' excitement for the game, the crowd noise, the distance traveled, and time may pose a problem for Texas. They have also compared the game to Texas' 2007 road trip to Central Florida, which was a very close win for Texas. Longhorn defensive coordinator Will Muschamp said of the time slot, "Doesn't matter where we play, who we play or what time we play, Texas defense is gonna show up and play." The Dallas Morning News reported the game was one of the most anticipated games in UTEP history and "because season-ticket packages were available for $99, some Texas fans bought them in advance to avoid the hassle of a single-game purchase. The sales pushed UTEP to nearly 24,000 season tickets, a school record."

The morning of the game, Las Vegas sports books favored Texas by 27 points. The attendance was 53,415, the largest crowd ever for the Sun Bowl Stadium.

UTEP got the ball to start the game and scored a field goal.  Texas was not able to secure a first down and punted back to Miners, who scored another field goal to take a 6–0 lead.  On their second possession, Texas drove 80 yards for a touchdown on a McCoy pass to Quan Cosby.  The extra point gave Texas a 7–6 lead which they still held at the end of the first quarter.

The Longhorns scored again ten seconds into the second quarter, as McCoy threw a 12-yard touchdown to wide receiver Dan Buckner.  The Miners attempted a 65-yard field goal, but it fell short and Quan Cosby returned it 65 yards.  Texas put John Chiles in as quarterback on the next series, and fullback Cody Johnson scored his second rushing touchdown of the season to make the score 21–6.  With four minutes to go in the half, McCoy threw a touchdown pass to tight end Blaine Irby to make the score 28–6 with the extra point.  UTEP scored a touchdown with 18 seconds remaining in the half, making the score 28–13 at half-time.

Texas got the ball to start the second half and drove to the UTEP 14-yard line when McCoy threw an interception in the UTEP end zone; it was his first interception of the season.  Neither team scored in the third quarter.

The Horns faked a wide receiver screen and scored on a McCoy pass to Jordan Shipley to extend the lead to 35–13.  On the next Miner possession, Emmanuel Acho forced a fumble and Roddrick Muckelroy returned it for a touchdown, making the score 42–13.  UTEP missed a field goal to end their next possession.  Texas punted on their next possession, and then took over on downs when UTEP was unable to score on their last possession.  The Horns kept the ball on the ground and ran out the clock.

NMSU

Chase Holbrook passed for 329 yards and five touchdowns to lead New Mexico State to a 34–33 win Saturday over UTEP.

Holbrook connected with wide receiver Marcus Anderson on three scores, including the go-ahead touchdown with 3:12 to go in the game. Anderson finished with five catches for 70 yards.

Holbrook has 1,269 passing yards in three games against the Miners (0–3).

With the win, NMSU (1–1) snapped a six-game losing streak, while UTEP extended its losing skid to nine games. It was the Aggies' first win in the Sun Bowl since 1994.

In the second quarter, NMSU went up 14–10 on a pair of passing scores from Holbrook to Anderson.

UTEP quarterback James Thomas II answered with a 44-yard scoring run, but NMSU went ahead 21–17 on a 27-yard touchdown reception by A.J. Harris.

UTEP's Jose Martinez kicked a 36-yard field goal to make it 21–20 with 3:05 remaining in the half.

The Aggies took a 28–27 lead into the fourth quarter, until Thomas stretched into the end zone from a yard out and put UTEP back up 33–28.

NMSU went ahead for good on Holbrook's final touchdown pass to Anderson. The Aggie defense forced a UTEP fumble, then stopped the Miners on a fourth-and-11 in the final minute.

UTEP's top two running backs were out with injuries and starting quarterback Trevor Vittatoe left the game for good with an ankle injury after the third series.

Thomas led UTEP with 142 yards rushing and two scores, becoming only the third Miner quarterback to eclipse the 100-yard mark since 1982.

UCF

Trevor Vittatoe threw for 263 yards and three touchdowns to lead UTEP to a 58–13 win over Central Florida on Saturday night, halting a streak of nine consecutive losses.

Jose Martinez kicked a 64-yard field goal for the Miners (1–3, 1–0 Conference USA).

Cornelius Brown, who had two interceptions and blocked a punt, led the UTEP defense as it forced UCF (1–3, 0–1) into six turnovers, including two fumbles recovered for touchdowns.

Vittatoe's second-quarter scoring pass to Jamar Hunt gave UTEP a 17-point lead, and Martinez' 64-yarder gave the Miners a 27–7 lead at halftime.

Rob Calabrese, making his first start for UCF, threw for 167 yards and a touchdown.

Southern Miss

Trevor Vittatoe threw four touchdown passes, including the game winner in double overtime, as UTEP defeated Southern Mississippi 40–37 on Saturday night.

Vittatoe hit Chris Adams on a 7-yard touchdown pass in the second overtime, after Southern Miss' Britt Barefoot gave the Golden Eagles a 37–34 lead with a 28-yard field goal.

It was the second consecutive victory for UTEP (2–3, 2–0 Conference USA) and the second straight loss for the Golden Eagles (2–3, 0–2).

Southern Miss is 0–2 in league play for the first time in the 13-year history of Conference USA.

The loss overshadowed a career-high effort by Damion Fletcher, who had 34 carries for 260 yards, becoming the program's all-time leading rusher in the third quarter. He has 3,654 career yards, passing Ben Garry, who finished with 3,595.

The 260-yard effort was also the second highest single-game mark in school history.

Vittatoe was 24 of 41 for 263 yards and four scores.

The Miners led 17–14 at halftime, thanks to a 37-yard field goal by Jose Martinez with 1:25 to go in the second quarter.

Fletcher gave USM an early lead on a 1-yard scoring run five minutes into the game.

Justin Estes missed a pair of short field goals for the Golden Eagles in the first half, one after Fletcher ran 56 yards to the Miners' 13.

Tory Harrison also had a 1-yard scoring run for USM in the second quarter.

The Miners responded with a 10-yard touchdown pass from Vittatoe to Adams and an 11-yard touchdown run by Donald Buckram in the first half.

Martinez made the score 20–14 with a 34-yard field goal at the 11:33 mark of the third quarter.

UTEP tried an onside kick that USM recovered at midfield. The Golden Eagles took advantage of it to take the lead with a 10-yard scoring pass from Austin Davis to Shawn Nelson.

The Miners came back with a 13-yard touchdown pass from Vittatoe to Tufick Shadrawy on the first play of the fourth quarter for a 27–21 lead.

But Barefoot replaced Estes in the second half, and despite missing his first attempt, kicked a pair of short field goals in the fourth quarter. The second, from 22 yards out on the final play of regulation, sent the game into overtime.

The teams traded 4-yard scoring passes in the first overtime, as Vittatoe hit Terrell Jackson and USM's Austin Davis found DeAndre Brown.

Tulane

Trevor Vittatoe threw three touchdown passes as UTEP came back for a 24–21 win over Tulane on Saturday night.

Vittatoe finished 21-of-32 passing for 296 yards.

The Miners (3–3, 3–0 Conference USA) reached .500 after an 0–3 start for the first time in school history.

Andre Anderson, who entered the game as the nation's ninth-leading rusher, carried the ball 29 times for 255 yards and two touchdowns for Tulane (2–4, 1–2).

UTEP took an early 7–0 lead, scoring on its opening possession for the first time this season.

Following rushing scores of 72 and 28 yards by Anderson, UTEP tied it 14–14 in the second quarter after Daniel Palmer hauled in a low pass and scurried 8 yards to the end zone.

Down 21–14 at halftime, UTEP inched back on a 28-yard field goal from Jose Martinez in the third quarter, then took the lead for good on a 68-yard bomb to Jeff Moturi with 4:22 remaining in the game.

Tulsa

David Johnson threw for 434 yards and five touchdowns to help lead Tulsa to a record-setting performance and a 77–35 blowout of UTEP.

Brennan Marion had six catches for 233 yards and three touchdowns Saturday night, setting a Conference USA record for yards per catch in a game (38.8), as Tulsa (7–0, 4–0 CUSA) strengthened its case to move into the national rankings. The Golden Hurricane hovered just outside the Associated Press poll this week.

Tulsa amassed 791 total yards, including 321 rushing.

UTEP (3–4, 3–1 CUSA) kept pace with Tulsa early and the game was tied 28–28 in the first quarter.

David Johnson connected with Marion on passes of 97 and 51 yards; Damaris Johnson returned a kickoff 94 yards for a score and A.J. Whitmore caught a 24-yard strike from David Johnson, who finished 21-for-27 with one interception.

UTEP quarterback Trevor Vittatoe hit Jeff Moturi with a 6-yard pass, Kris Adams with a 22-yard strike and a 1-yarder to Jamar Hunt for a score. He finished 21 of 34 for 321 yards and four touchdowns.

By the second quarter, Tulsa had turned up the heat, rattling Vittatoe with a variety of blitzes and holding the Miners scoreless, while the Golden Hurricane scored 28 consecutive points.

Tarrion Adams, who finished with 115 yards, scored two touchdown in the third quarter that gave Tulsa a 63–35 advantage and UTEP lost all fight after that.

Marion added a 40-yard touchdown before the quarter ended to make it 70–35.

Rice

Chase Clement threw for 372 yards and accounted for six TDs, and Rice matched its best conference record in nearly a half-century with a 49–44 win over Texas-El Paso on Saturday night.

Clement threw five TD passes and ran for a 3-yard score that gave Rice the lead for good in the second quarter. UTEP kept close, and a third touchdown pass from Trevor Vittatoe to Jeff Moturi with 1:23 left gave the Miners hope before their onside kick attempt failed.

Rice (6–3, 5–1 Conference USA) clinched bowl eligibility for the second time in three seasons. Not since 1960 have the Owls been 5–1 in conference play.

Louisiana-Lafayette

Trevor Vittatoe threw touchdown passes to each team as UTEP finished the first quarter tied 7–7 with Louisiana-Lafayette.

Gerren Blount intercepted Vittatoe and returned it 55 yards for the opening score, but UTEP answered with 1:51 left in the first quarter on Jeff Moturi's fifth touchdown reception in the last three games. It came from 16 yards out. Moturi's 20th career touchdown catch put him all alone in third on UTEP's all-time list.

By Halftime, The UTEP defense played perhaps its best half of the season, holding the Louisiana-Lafayette to three offensive points and the Miners led 16–10 at the intermission. In the Second Quarter, Trevor Vittatoe threw touchdown passes to Tufick Shadrawy and Jeff Moturi, but also threw one to the Rajin' Cajuns' Gerren Blount to open the scoring. UTEP answered with 1:51 left in the first quarter on Jeff Moturi's fifth touchdown reception in the last three games. It came from 16 yards out. Moturi's 20th career touchdown catch put him all alone in third on UTEP's all-time list. The Miners also made a goal-line stand shortly before their final touchdown of the half, which came with 51 seconds left on a 32-yard field goal.

Miners defeat Louisiana-Lafayette LAFAYETTE, La. – The UTEP football team picked up its second road win of the year on Saturday with a 37–24 victory against Louisiana-Lafayette at Cajun Field. The Miners improved to 4–5 overall with the win in the non-conference game. UTEP is 3–2 in Conference USA going into next week's Conference USA home game against SMU. The Ragin' Cajuns fell to 5–4 on the season and saw a four-game win streak come to an end. However, the loss didn't affect the team's Sun Belt Conference mark, which remained at 4–0. The win allowed UTEP to keep alive hopes of qualifying for a bowl game this season. UTEP needs two more wins in its final three games to qualify for one. After hosting SMU next week, the Miners finish the season with road trips to Houston and East Carolina.

SMU

Trevor Vittatoe threw for 410 yards and connected with Kris Adams for three touchdowns to lead UTEP to a 36–10 victory over SMU on Saturday night.

Vittatoe completed 21-of-31 passes, finishing his evening after just three-quarters. Adams caught five of those passes for 145 yards and the three touchdowns. It was a career-high for Vittatoe and Adams, both sophomores.

Vittatoe connected with Adams for an 85-yard touchdown pass on UTEP's first play from scrimmage. The Miners (5–5, 4–2 Conference USA) rolled up 544 total yards and never trailed, leading 10–3 after one quarter and 26–3 at the half.

Jose Martinez kicked five field goals in the game, connecting from 34, 48, 26, 31 and 23 yards.

SMU (1–10, 0–7) scored its lone touchdown in the fourth quarter after trailing 36–3. Logan Turner hit Bradley Haynes with a 27-yard pass for the touchdown.

Houston

Although meeting for the first time during the Cougars' inaugural season in 1946, the UTEP Miners had only met with the Cougars five times in history. As Conference USA foes, the Cougars held a 2–3 all-time record against the Miners, whereas both wins came consecutively during the 2006 and 2007 meetings of the teams. Mike Price returned as the Miners' head coach this season. After a close game, where Houston lagged behind, the Cougars made a fourth quarter comeback to win the game.

East Carolina

The Pirates welcome the Miners to Greenville for the first time ever. East Carolina and this Conference USA West opponent are meeting for the second time. The first meeting occurred last fall in El Paso, Texas. ECU won in overtime, 45–42 in the Sun Bowl.

References

UTEP
UTEP Miners football seasons
UTEP Miners football